Kavita Roy (born 10 April 1980 in Hajipur, Bihar) is a former One Day International cricketer who represented India. She played one One Day International. She is a right-hand batsman and bowls right-arm medium pace.

References

Living people
People from Hajipur
Cricketers from Bihar
1980 births
Indian women cricketers
India women One Day International cricketers
Sportswomen from Bihar

Jharkhand women cricketers
East Zone women cricketers
People from Vaishali district